Bartonella saheliensis is a Gram-negative bacterium from the genus Bartonella which has been isolated from the blood of a Kemp's gerbil from Sine-Saloum in Senegal.

References

Bartonellaceae
Bacteria described in 2020